Prataprajella is a genus of fungi within the Meliolaceae family.

References

External links
Prataprajella at Index Fungorum

Meliolaceae